Homeland Insecurity is the debut album by Endwell. It was released on October 31, 2006 on Victory Records.

Track listing
 "The End"
 "A Taste of Everest"
 "Single and Loving It"
 "Four Letter Words"
 "Homeland Insecurity"
 "Goodbyes Are Always Coldest in December"
 "Boy Meets World War III"
 "I'm Frozen and You're Dead"
 "Drowning (One Last Breath)"
 "Whine and Dine"
 "Fever White"
 "Zombies Never Think Twice"

"Single And Loving It" was made into a music video.

2006 albums
Endwell (band) albums